Faiz-ul Hassan Shah, known by some as Khatib ul Islam, was a Pakistani Islamic religious scholar, orator, poet, and writer.

Political and social contribution 

He was president of Jamiat Ulema-e-Pakistan for ten years, and struggled to establish Islamic reforms in Pakistan. He was also a provincial president of Majlis-e-Ahrar-ul-Islam.

Religious and academic work 
In 1932, after the death of his father, he became the religious leader of Allo Mahar. He began leading Friday prayers and teaching the congregation of Allo Mahar in different parts of the Indian subcontinent and became a famous orator. He contributed to the Tahreek-e-Tahaffuz-e-Khatm-e-Nubuwwat , which is an organization created to preserve the Islamic tenet of Finality of Prophethood.} He led the movement in the days of British rule in India against Ahmadis. For 20 years he led the Eid prayer in the police line at Gujranwala.
He visited Karachi as a president of Jamiat Ulma e Pakistan and made his historic speech which was highly appreciated by all scholars at that time.

References 

The Preaching of Islam by Sir Thomas Walker Arnold and Langue la literature Hindoustanies de 1850 à 1869 by M.J.H. Garcin de Tassy.
The most well-known treatises and reports, written by the authors of the early period are:
Mashaiekh e Allo Mahar Shrief written by Allmaa Pir saeed Ahmad Mujadadi and published by Idara e Tanzeem ul Islam Gujjranwala.
"Allo Mahar Sharif". Kawajgan e Naqshband (book name). 
"Kwaja Nur muhammad chhrahi's caliph". Arbab e Waliyat (book name). 
"caliph's of chura sharif". Auliya e pothohar (book name). 
Shaik gulam nabi. Amir e Karwan Syed Faiz ul Hasan shah (book name). 
"Syed Faiz ul Hassan shah". Tahreek e Ihrar (book name). 
Dr. Rizwan Sarwar. Mashaikh e Maharvia (under publish). 
Pir Saeed Ahmad Mujadadi. Maharvia number (book name).

See also 
Allo Mahar
Syed Muhammad Jewan Shah Naqvi
Pir Syed Muhammad Channan Shah Nuri
Muhammad Amin Shah Sani
Pir Syed Khalid Hasan Shah
Sahabzada Syed Murtaza Amin

Islamic religious leaders
1911 births
1984 deaths
Pakistani Sunni Muslims
Pakistani religious leaders
People from Sialkot
Murray College alumni
Sialkot District
Barelvis